William Smyth, (1683–1759) was an 18th-century Anglican priest in Ireland.

Bishop Thomas Smyth, he was born in Raphoe and educated at Trinity College, Dublin. Smith was  Dean of Ardfert from 1728 and Archdeacon of Meath holding both posts until 1732.

References

Alumni of Trinity College Dublin
18th-century Irish Anglican priests
Archdeacons of Meath
1683 births
1759 deaths